Giles Earle may refer to two English people:
 Giles Earle (musician) (fl. 1615)
 Giles Earle (politician) (1678–1758)